Dinner in Colombia is a 33-RPM LP album by Venezuelan composer/arranger/conductor Aldemaro Romero, released in 1956, under contract with RCA Victor.

This album was part of a very successful series of records, whose names began with  "Dinner in ..." featuring popular Latin American pieces, starting in 1955 with Dinner in Caracas.

Track listing

1956 albums
Aldemaro Romero albums
RCA Records albums
Albums produced by Aldemaro Romero